was a railway station on the Nemuro Main Line in Nemuro, Hokkaido, Japan, operated by Hokkaido Railway Company (JR Hokkaido). Opened in 1921, it closed in March 2015.

Lines

History
The station opened on 5 August 1921. With the privatization of Japanese National Railways (JNR) on 1 April 1987, the station came under the control of JR Hokkaido.

Closure
In September 2015, it was announced that JR Hokkaido planned to close this station in March 2016. The station closed following the last day of services on 25 March 2016.

See also
 List of railway stations in Japan

References

Railway stations in Hokkaido Prefecture
Stations of Hokkaido Railway Company
Railway stations in Japan opened in 1921
Railway stations closed in 2016
2016 disestablishments in Japan